Ansel Watrous (November 1, 1835August 6, 1927) was an American newspaper editor and historian.

A longtime resident of Fort Collins, Colorado, Watrous is noted for History of Larimer County, Colorado (1911), the first comprehensive published history of Larimer County, Colorado. A Forest Service campground in the Poudre Canyon in the Roosevelt National Forest northwest of Fort Collins is named for him.

Life
Ansel was born November 1, 1835, in Conquinbroom County, New York, the eldest of six children of Oron and Jane Watrous. Oron was a brother of William Watrous, who would settle in Fort Collins in 1871, where Ansel, his nephew, would join him years later. The Watrous family came from England in colonial times. They and their descendants were prominent in the affairs of war and peace in Pennsylvania, Connecticut, and New York, during the Revolutionary War, the War of 1812 and the Indian Wars.

Ansel was named for his paternal grandfather, a country squire of Susquehanna, Pennsylvania. 

His father moved his family to Brotherton, Wisconsin, but in two years he died of cholera and the family moved to New York State. At seventeen Ansel, having had some education at a private academy, was apprenticed to a carpenter. At 20 he returned to Wisconsin, and on Christmas Day 1856 married Floral Thompson of Stockbridge, Wisconsin. He followed his trade of contracting and building and also taught school. He had an interest in politics, being elected to the position of Sheriff in 1860 and in 1864 as a county clerk. 

In December 1877 he took the first step toward moving to Fort Collins, making a four-day trip on the Colorado Central Railroad. He was met by his uncle Willian F. Watrous and taken to the Watrous home on Myrtle Street. He had arrived on December 30 and on the first of January went to work for W.C. Stover at his store. He was forty-two and had left a settled community where he was known and respected to move to a frontier town with few houses or trees and with only boardwalks alongside muddy streets. He sensed, however, the excitement of a frontier town. The sound of sawing and hammering and the site of wagons loaded with building materials and streets crowded with all sorts of people told him the town was on the move. 

It isn't clear when his wife, Floral Thompsen Watrous, left her close-knit family in Wisconsin for what became a lonely life on the frontier. She found it difficult to adjust and wrote of her loneliness to her family but stayed to make her husband a home writing, "I can never be happy away from him." 

Watrous lost no time in establishing himself. By June 1877 he was the co-founder of a newspaper the Fort Collins Courier. His partner, Elmer Felton, had some newspaper experience and Watrous had some knowledge of printing, as it had once been his father's trade. The Fort Collins Courier had a difficult founding. The men worked with an old Washington Hand Press, which was in poor condition, nor did they have enough type. The press was good for only a seven - column format. That problem was solved by having two pages of the paper printed in Chicago and shipped by rail to Fort Collins where it was joined with two pages of local news. This despite the paper's motto of "home first, the world afterwards." In early 1879 they finally had enough type to print the whole paper locally. 

A columnist for a later paper, the Express Courier, called the paper "a fiery, Democratic newspaper in a hostile and smugly vindictive community noted for its conservative posture." In November 1880 the paper was expanded to eight columns and two years later, with a new power press, a daily edition was started. Watrous bought Felton out at this time and was the sole proprietor and editor until 1886, when he sold the paper to the Courier Printing and Publishing Company. He stayed on as president and editor, even when the paper was again sold, this time to a Republican. 

In 1881 Watrous was appointed to the town board of trustees. He tried politics in 1882 and 1884 as the Democratic candidate for state auditor but was defeated both times. He was appointed Postmaster from 1885–1889, during the Cleveland administration. In 1889 Watrous served on the board of directors for the new Public Library Association. 

In November 1878 Watrous got his first full view of the Rocky Mountains. He'd gone with his uncle in a spring wagon to get firewood to a place west of the Batterson Ranch. "Nothing exciting about the ride," he wrote, "but I was delighted with the view of snow-capped peaks in the distance with the panorama of rock rested and timbered covered hills which unrolled itself to our gaze. It was my first view of the Rocky Mountains. A view I had longed for, and I shall never forget that day's ride." 

His love of the region would inspire him to write the History of Larimer County, Colorado, which he completed in 1910.

Burial 
Watrous was buried in Grandview Cemetery, Fort Collins.

Notes

Writers from Fort Collins, Colorado
Larimer County, Colorado
American historians
1835 births
1927 deaths